The Parnassiini are a tribe of swallowtail butterflies.

Genera
The tribe is thought to consist of two genera:

 Hypermnestra
 Parnassius

References
 Nazari et al. (2007) Phylogeny, historical biogeography, and taxonomic ranking of Parnassiinae (Lepidoptera, Papilionidae) based on morphology and seven genes. Molecular Phylogenetics and Evolution. 42(1):131–156. PDF

External links
 

Papilionidae
Taxa named by Philogène Auguste Joseph Duponchel
Butterfly tribes